Battlefield 1942: The Road to Rome is an expansion pack for the Battlefield 1942 video game. It was released in February 2003 by Electronic Arts and developed by DICE. Six maps featuring battles that took place in Italy were added (such as Operation Husky and the Battle of Anzio), along with eight vehicles, including the German Bf 110 and the British Mosquito fighter-bombers and the M3 Grant medium tank. French and Italian forces are included. Engineers can mount a bayonet on their rifle for hand-to-hand combat. The Italian Breda 30 and the British Sten SMG have been added. Extra scenes are added to the original Battlefield 1942 intro.

Reception

Battlefield 1942: The Road to Rome received "favorable" reviews according to the review aggregation website Metacritic. What was criticized was the lack of new multiplayer modes, lack of new weapons, (having only the Breda 30 for the Italians and the Sten Mk.II for the British and French), and no stability increases. A favored feature were the map designs.

References

External links
 

2003 video games
 01.2
Digital Illusions CE games
Electronic Arts games
Multiplayer and single-player video games
Multiplayer online games
Video game expansion packs
Video games developed in Sweden
Video games set in Italy
Video games set in Sicily
Windows games
Windows-only games
World War II first-person shooters